Nuevo Circo is a Caracas Metro station on Line 4. It was opened on 19 July 2006 as part of the inaugural section of the line between Capuchinos and Zona Rental. The station is located between Teatros and Parque Central.

References

Caracas Metro stations
2006 establishments in Venezuela
Railway stations opened in 2006